Johann Schulz may refer to:

 Johann Schulz (sport shooter), (1897–?), German Olympic sport shooter
 Johann Schulz (swimmer), (?–1942), German Olympic swimmer
 Johann Abraham Peter Schulz (1747–1800), German musician
 Johann Heinrich Schulz (1739–1823), German Lutheran pastor
 Johann Philipp Christian Schulz (1773–1827), German composer and conductor